The 2003–04 Vancouver Canucks season was the Canucks' 34th NHL season. It was the first time since the Northwest Division was created that a team other than the Colorado Avalanche won the division title.

Regular season
The Canucks began their season with the top line of Brendan Morrison, Markus Naslund and Todd Bertuzzi. The Sedin twins continued to develop and began seeing some success initially being paired with Jason King. With their initial team chemistry, Jason King plotting 12 goals and being named NHL Rookie of the Month in November. The trio briefly formed "The Mattress Line" (Two Twins and a King). The season looked promising with the Canucks being near the top of the standings. When February came along, the Canucks narrowly defeated the Colorado Avalanche 1-0 but it came at a cost with Avalanche forward Steve Moore hitting Canucks captain Markus Naslund resulting in Naslund getting a concussion and Moore not penalized. Many Canucks vowed revenge against Moore (notably Brad May).  When the two teams met again in Denver on March 3 (with NHL Commissioner Gary Bettman in attendance), there were no incidents and both teams skated to a 5-5 draw.  On March 8, however, in Vancouver, everything fell apart. The Avalanche jumped out to a 5-0 lead and Brad May cut the deficit to 5-2 while at the same time taunting Avalanche goalie David Aebischer after each goal. Bertuzzi made it his personal mission to go after Steve Moore and after trying (and failing) to incite him, sucker punched him and falling on top of him. Bertuzzi would be suspended the rest of the regular season and playoffs. The Canucks had some difficulty recovering from this incident and managed to win the Northwest Division on the final day of the regular season, their first division championship since the 1992-93 season.

Final standings

Playoffs

Western Conference Quarterfinals vs. (6) Calgary Flames
After splitting the first two games in Vancouver, Dan Cloutier was injured midway through Game 3 in Calgary. With backup Johan Hedberg playing in relief, Vancouver would also split Games 3 and 4 in Calgary. Alex Auld took over in goal starting in Game 5, which the Canucks lost 2-1. Facing elimination in Game 6, Brendan Morrison scored the winner in the third overtime period to force a Game 7 in Vancouver. In the series-deciding game, the Canucks found themselves down a goal and on the penalty kill in the last minute. With Auld on the bench for the extra attacker, winger Matt Cooke tied the game with 5.7 seconds left to force overtime. However, with Ed Jovanovski still in the penalty box, former Canuck Martin Gelinas eliminated the Canucks on the power play.

Schedule and results

Regular season

|- align="center" bgcolor="#CCFFCC"
|1||W||October 9, 2003||4–1 || align="left"|  Calgary Flames (2003–04) ||1–0–0–0 || 
|- align="center" bgcolor="#CCFFCC"
|2||W||October 11, 2003||3–0 || align="left"|  Edmonton Oilers (2003–04) ||2–0–0–0 || 
|- align="center" bgcolor="#FFBBBB"
|3||L||October 13, 2003||2–3 || align="left"| @ Columbus Blue Jackets (2003–04) ||2–1–0–0 || 
|- align="center" bgcolor="#FFBBBB"
|4||L||October 16, 2003||2–3 || align="left"| @ Detroit Red Wings (2003–04) ||2–2–0–0 || 
|- align="center"
|5||T||October 18, 2003||2–2 OT|| align="left"| @ Minnesota Wild (2003–04) ||2–2–1–0 || 
|- align="center" bgcolor="#CCFFCC"
|6||W||October 20, 2003||6–1 || align="left"|  Buffalo Sabres (2003–04) ||3–2–1–0 || 
|- align="center" bgcolor="#CCFFCC"
|7||W||October 22, 2003||3–2 || align="left"|  St. Louis Blues (2003–04) ||4–2–1–0 || 
|- align="center"
|8||T||October 26, 2003||3–3 OT|| align="left"|  Phoenix Coyotes (2003–04) ||4–2–2–0 || 
|- align="center" bgcolor="#CCFFCC"
|9||W||October 28, 2003||6–3 || align="left"|  Columbus Blue Jackets (2003–04) ||5–2–2–0 || 
|- align="center" bgcolor="#CCFFCC"
|10||W||October 30, 2003||3–1 || align="left"| @ Los Angeles Kings (2003–04) ||6–2–2–0 || 
|- align="center" bgcolor="#CCFFCC"
|11||W||October 31, 2003||4–1 || align="left"| @ Phoenix Coyotes (2003–04) ||7–2–2–0 || 
|-

|- align="center" bgcolor="#CCFFCC"
|12||W||November 3, 2003||5–1 || align="left"|  Detroit Red Wings (2003–04) ||8–2–2–0 || 
|- align="center" bgcolor="#CCFFCC"
|13||W||November 5, 2003||4–3 || align="left"| @ Nashville Predators (2003–04) ||9–2–2–0 || 
|- align="center" bgcolor="#FFBBBB"
|14||L||November 6, 2003||2–3 || align="left"| @ St. Louis Blues (2003–04) ||9–3–2–0 || 
|- align="center" bgcolor="#CCFFCC"
|15||W||November 8, 2003||4–3 || align="left"|  Minnesota Wild (2003–04) ||10–3–2–0 || 
|- align="center" bgcolor="#FFBBBB"
|16||L||November 11, 2003||0–1 || align="left"| @ Minnesota Wild (2003–04) ||10–4–2–0 || 
|- align="center" bgcolor="#FF6F6F"
|17||OTL||November 13, 2003||3–4 OT|| align="left"| @ Philadelphia Flyers (2003–04) ||10–4–2–1 || 
|- align="center" bgcolor="#FF6F6F"
|18||OTL||November 15, 2003||1–2 OT|| align="left"| @ Boston Bruins (2003–04) ||10–4–2–2 || 
|- align="center" bgcolor="#CCFFCC"
|19||W||November 18, 2003||5–4 OT|| align="left"|  Montreal Canadiens (2003–04) ||11–4–2–2 || 
|- align="center" bgcolor="#CCFFCC"
|20||W||November 20, 2003||3–2 OT|| align="left"|  Chicago Blackhawks (2003–04) ||12–4–2–2 || 
|- align="center" bgcolor="#FFBBBB"
|21||L||November 22, 2003||3–5 || align="left"|  Toronto Maple Leafs (2003–04) ||12–5–2–2 || 
|- align="center" bgcolor="#FFBBBB"
|22||L||November 24, 2003||1–2 || align="left"| @ Toronto Maple Leafs (2003–04) ||12–6–2–2 || 
|- align="center" bgcolor="#CCFFCC"
|23||W||November 25, 2003||5–2 || align="left"| @ Montreal Canadiens (2003–04) ||13–6–2–2 || 
|- align="center" bgcolor="#CCFFCC"
|24||W||November 27, 2003||3–2 OT|| align="left"| @ Ottawa Senators (2003–04) ||14–6–2–2 || 
|- align="center"
|25||T||November 29, 2003||4–4 OT|| align="left"| @ Calgary Flames (2003–04) ||14–6–3–2 || 
|-

|- align="center" bgcolor="#FFBBBB"
|26||L||December 4, 2003||1–4 || align="left"|  Calgary Flames (2003–04) ||14–7–3–2 || 
|- align="center"
|27||T||December 6, 2003||1–1 OT|| align="left"|  Minnesota Wild (2003–04) ||14–7–4–2 || 
|- align="center" bgcolor="#CCFFCC"
|28||W||December 9, 2003||4–3 OT|| align="left"|  Pittsburgh Penguins (2003–04) ||15–7–4–2 || 
|- align="center"
|29||T||December 11, 2003||1–1 OT|| align="left"|  Colorado Avalanche (2003–04) ||15–7–5–2 || 
|- align="center" bgcolor="#CCFFCC"
|30||W||December 14, 2003||2–1 OT|| align="left"|  Carolina Hurricanes (2003–04) ||16–7–5–2 || 
|- align="center" bgcolor="#CCFFCC"
|31||W||December 16, 2003||2–1 OT|| align="left"| @ Nashville Predators (2003–04) ||17–7–5–2 || 
|- align="center" bgcolor="#FFBBBB"
|32||L||December 17, 2003||1–3 || align="left"| @ Dallas Stars (2003–04) ||17–8–5–2 || 
|- align="center" bgcolor="#CCFFCC"
|33||W||December 20, 2003||3–0 || align="left"| @ Edmonton Oilers (2003–04) ||18–8–5–2 || 
|- align="center"
|34||T||December 22, 2003||4–4 OT|| align="left"|  Los Angeles Kings (2003–04) ||18–8–6–2 || 
|- align="center" bgcolor="#CCFFCC"
|35||W||December 26, 2003||2–0 || align="left"| @ Calgary Flames (2003–04) ||19–8–6–2 || 
|- align="center" bgcolor="#FFBBBB"
|36||L||December 27, 2003||2–6 || align="left"|  Edmonton Oilers (2003–04) ||19–9–6–2 || 
|- align="center" bgcolor="#CCFFCC"
|37||W||December 29, 2003||3–2 || align="left"| @ Colorado Avalanche (2003–04) ||20–9–6–2 || 
|- align="center" bgcolor="#CCFFCC"
|38||W||December 31, 2003||4–3 OT|| align="left"| @ Chicago Blackhawks (2003–04) ||21–9–6–2 || 
|-

|- align="center" bgcolor="#FFBBBB"
|39||L||January 2, 2004||2–4 || align="left"|  Colorado Avalanche (2003–04) ||21–10–6–2 || 
|- align="center" bgcolor="#CCFFCC"
|40||W||January 3, 2004||3–1 || align="left"| @ Calgary Flames (2003–04) ||22–10–6–2 || 
|- align="center" bgcolor="#FFBBBB"
|41||L||January 5, 2004||1–2 || align="left"|  San Jose Sharks (2003–04) ||22–11–6–2 || 
|- align="center" bgcolor="#CCFFCC"
|42||W||January 8, 2004||3–1 || align="left"| @ Los Angeles Kings (2003–04) ||23–11–6–2 || 
|- align="center" bgcolor="#CCFFCC"
|43||W||January 9, 2004||5–2 || align="left"| @ Mighty Ducks of Anaheim (2003–04) ||24–11–6–2 || 
|- align="center"
|44||T||January 11, 2004||2–2 OT|| align="left"|  Florida Panthers (2003–04) ||24–11–7–2 || 
|- align="center" bgcolor="#CCFFCC"
|45||W||January 13, 2004||4–1 || align="left"| @ Phoenix Coyotes (2003–04) ||25–11–7–2 || 
|- align="center" bgcolor="#FFBBBB"
|46||L||January 15, 2004||1–3 || align="left"| @ San Jose Sharks (2003–04) ||25–12–7–2 || 
|- align="center" bgcolor="#FFBBBB"
|47||L||January 17, 2004||1–2 || align="left"|  Mighty Ducks of Anaheim (2003–04) ||25–13–7–2 || 
|- align="center" bgcolor="#FFBBBB"
|48||L||January 19, 2004||2–3 || align="left"|  Dallas Stars (2003–04) ||25–14–7–2 || 
|- align="center" bgcolor="#CCFFCC"
|49||W||January 21, 2004||5–4 OT|| align="left"|  Tampa Bay Lightning (2003–04) ||26–14–7–2 || 
|- align="center" bgcolor="#CCFFCC"
|50||W||January 25, 2004||4–1 || align="left"|  Nashville Predators (2003–04) ||27–14–7–2 || 
|- align="center" bgcolor="#CCFFCC"
|51||W||January 27, 2004||3–2 || align="left"|  Chicago Blackhawks (2003–04) ||28–14–7–2 || 
|- align="center" bgcolor="#CCFFCC"
|52||W||January 29, 2004||4–2 || align="left"| @ St. Louis Blues (2003–04) ||29–14–7–2 || 
|- align="center" bgcolor="#CCFFCC"
|53||W||January 31, 2004||6–1 || align="left"| @ Washington Capitals (2003–04) ||30–14–7–2 || 
|-

|- align="center" bgcolor="#FFBBBB"
|54||L||February 2, 2004||3–4 || align="left"| @ New York Rangers (2003–04) ||30–15–7–2 || 
|- align="center" bgcolor="#FF6F6F"
|55||OTL||February 3, 2004||4–5 OT|| align="left"| @ New York Islanders (2003–04) ||30–15–7–3 || 
|- align="center" bgcolor="#CCFFCC"
|56||W||February 5, 2004||4–0 || align="left"| @ New Jersey Devils (2003–04) ||31–15–7–3 || 
|- align="center" bgcolor="#FFBBBB"
|57||L||February 11, 2004||2–3 || align="left"|  Calgary Flames (2003–04) ||31–16–7–3 || 
|- align="center" bgcolor="#FFBBBB"
|58||L||February 13, 2004||1–4 || align="left"|  Atlanta Thrashers (2003–04) ||31–17–7–3 || 
|- align="center" bgcolor="#FFBBBB"
|59||L||February 14, 2004||1–2 || align="left"|  Mighty Ducks of Anaheim (2003–04) ||31–18–7–3 || 
|- align="center" bgcolor="#CCFFCC"
|60||W||February 16, 2004||1–0 || align="left"| @ Colorado Avalanche (2003–04) ||32–18–7–3 || 
|- align="center" bgcolor="#FFBBBB"
|61||L||February 19, 2004||2–6 || align="left"| @ Minnesota Wild (2003–04) ||32–19–7–3 || 
|- align="center" bgcolor="#FF6F6F"
|62||OTL||February 21, 2004||3–4 OT|| align="left"| @ Edmonton Oilers (2003–04) ||32–19–7–4 || 
|- align="center" bgcolor="#CCFFCC"
|63||W||February 24, 2004||4–2 || align="left"|  Detroit Red Wings (2003–04) ||33–19–7–4 || 
|- align="center" bgcolor="#CCFFCC"
|64||W||February 26, 2004||3–2 OT|| align="left"|  San Jose Sharks (2003–04) ||34–19–7–4 || 
|- align="center" bgcolor="#CCFFCC"
|65||W||February 28, 2004||2–0 || align="left"|  St. Louis Blues (2003–04) ||35–19–7–4 || 
|-

|- align="center"
|66||T||March 3, 2004||5–5 OT|| align="left"| @ Colorado Avalanche (2003–04) ||35–19–8–4 || 
|- align="center" bgcolor="#FFBBBB"
|67||L||March 5, 2004||1–3 || align="left"| @ Detroit Red Wings (2003–04) ||35–20–8–4 || 
|- align="center" bgcolor="#CCFFCC"
|68||W||March 6, 2004||4–0 || align="left"| @ Columbus Blue Jackets (2003–04) ||36–20–8–4 || 
|- align="center" bgcolor="#FFBBBB"
|69||L||March 8, 2004||2–9 || align="left"|  Colorado Avalanche (2003–04) ||36–21–8–4 || 
|- align="center"
|70||T||March 10, 2004||1–1 OT|| align="left"|  Minnesota Wild (2003–04) ||36–21–9–4 || 
|- align="center" bgcolor="#CCFFCC"
|71||W||March 12, 2004||4–3 OT|| align="left"| @ Edmonton Oilers (2003–04) ||37–21–9–4 || 
|- align="center" bgcolor="#FFBBBB"
|72||L||March 13, 2004||1–2 || align="left"|  Ottawa Senators (2003–04) ||37–22–9–4 || 
|- align="center"
|73||T||March 16, 2004||2–2 OT|| align="left"|  Nashville Predators (2003–04) ||37–22–10–4 || 
|- align="center" bgcolor="#FFBBBB"
|74||L||March 18, 2004||0–3 || align="left"| @ Dallas Stars (2003–04) ||37–23–10–4 || 
|- align="center" bgcolor="#FF6F6F"
|75||OTL||March 19, 2004||3–4 OT|| align="left"| @ Chicago Blackhawks (2003–04) ||37–23–10–5 || 
|- align="center" bgcolor="#FFBBBB"
|76||L||March 21, 2004||4–5 || align="left"|  Columbus Blue Jackets (2003–04) ||37–24–10–5 || 
|- align="center" bgcolor="#CCFFCC"
|77||W||March 24, 2004||1–0 || align="left"|  Los Angeles Kings (2003–04) ||38–24–10–5 || 
|- align="center" bgcolor="#CCFFCC"
|78||W||March 27, 2004||3–2 OT|| align="left"|  Dallas Stars (2003–04) ||39–24–10–5 || 
|- align="center" bgcolor="#CCFFCC"
|79||W||March 29, 2004||6–1 || align="left"|  Phoenix Coyotes (2003–04) ||40–24–10–5 || 
|- align="center" bgcolor="#CCFFCC"
|80||W||March 31, 2004||2–1 || align="left"| @ Mighty Ducks of Anaheim (2003–04) ||41–24–10–5 || 
|-

|- align="center" bgcolor="#CCFFCC"
|81||W||April 2, 2004||4–1 || align="left"| @ San Jose Sharks (2003–04) ||42–24–10–5 || 
|- align="center" bgcolor="#CCFFCC"
|82||W||April 3, 2004||5–2 || align="left"|  Edmonton Oilers (2003–04) ||43–24–10–5 || 
|-

|-
| Legend:

Playoffs

|- align="center" bgcolor="#CCFFCC"
| 1 || April 7 || Calgary || 3–5 ||  Vancouver ||  || Cloutier || 18,630 || Canucks lead 1–0 || 
|- align="center" bgcolor="#FFBBBB"
| 2 || April 9 || Calgary || 2–1 || Vancouver ||  || Kiprusoff || 18,630 || Series tied 1–1 || 
|- align="center"  bgcolor="#CCFFCC"   
| 3 || April 11 || Vancouver || 2–1 || Calgary || || Hedberg || 19,289 || Canucks lead 2–1 || 
|- align="center"  bgcolor="#FFBBBB"
| 4 || April 13 || Vancouver || 0–4 || Calgary ||  || Kiprusoff || 19,289 || Series tied 2–2 || 
|- align="center" bgcolor="#FFBBBB"
| 5 || April 15 || Calgary || 2–1 || Vancouver || || Kiprusoff || 18,630 || Flames lead 3–2 || 
|- align="center" bgcolor="#CCFFCC" 
| 6 || April 17 || Vancouver || 5–4 || Calgary || 3OT || Auld || 19,289 || Series tied 3–3 || 
|- align="center" bgcolor="#FFBBBB"
| 7 || April 19 || Calgary || 3–2 || Vancouver || OT || Kiprusoff || 18,630 || Flames win 4–3 || 
|-

|-
| Legend:

Player statistics

Scoring
 Position abbreviations: C = Centre; D = Defence; G = Goaltender; LW = Left Wing; RW = Right Wing
  = Joined team via a transaction (e.g., trade, waivers, signing) during the season. Stats reflect time with the Canucks only.
  = Left team via a transaction (e.g., trade, waivers, release) during the season. Stats reflect time with the Canucks only.

Goaltending

Awards and records

Awards

Transactions
The Canucks were involved in the following transactions from June 10, 2003, the day after the deciding game of the 2003 Stanley Cup Finals, through June 7, 2004, the day of the deciding game of the 2004 Stanley Cup Finals.

Trades

Players acquired

Players lost

Signings

Draft picks
Vancouver's draft picks at the 2003 NHL Entry Draft held at the Gaylord Entertainment Center in Nashville, Tennessee.

See also
 2003–04 NHL season

Notes

References

 
 

Vancouver Canucks seasons
Vancouver C
Vancouver